Oleg II Ivanovich was Prince of Ryazan and Grand Prince of Ryazan from 1350 to 1402. 

He is best known for his rivalry with Prince Dmitry of Moscow and his mysterious role in Battle of Kulikovo. Oleg was nominally an ally of Golden Horde, but he did not participate in the battle, and several of his boyars fought and died on the Russian side.

Grand Princes of Ryazan
14th-century rulers in Europe
His daughter is married to Yury of Smolensk.